Pitt Meadows station is a stop on the West Coast Express commuter rail line connecting Vancouver to Mission, British Columbia, Canada. The station is located on the south side of the Canadian Pacific Railway (CPR) tracks in Pitt Meadows, just off Harris Road. The station opened in 1995, when the West Coast Express began operating. 140 park-and-ride spots are available. All services are operated by TransLink.

Station information

Station layout

Transit connections

Pitt Meadows is served by five West Coast Express trains per day in each direction: five in the morning to Vancouver, and five in the evening to Mission. The station is adjacent to a park-and-ride facility and bus loop.

References

External links
Pitt Meadows station map (PDF file)

Pitt Meadows
Railway stations in Canada opened in 1995
West Coast Express stations